The Royal Cornwall Agricultural Show, usually called the Royal Cornwall Show, is an agricultural show organised by the Royal Cornwall Agricultural Association, which takes place at the beginning of June each year, at Wadebridge in north Cornwall, England, United Kingdom. The showground is on the south side of the A39 main road and between the hamlets of St Breock and Whitecross. Members of the Royal family often attend at the Show, including Prince Charles who is a supporter of the farming community. Princess Alexandra attended the 2009 show. The show lasts for three days and attracts approximately 120,000 visitors annually.

History
The Royal Cornwall Agricultural Association was founded in 1793, and has been known by that name since 1858.

The show was held at Truro between 1827 and 1857, and from then on the venue changed every year until 1960, when the showground at Wadebridge became its permanent home. No show was held from 1915 to 1918, 1940 to 1945 nor 2020.

 YEAR – LOCATION, ATTENDANCE
 1827 to 1857 – Truro
 1858
 1859
 1860
 1861
 1862
 1863
 1864
 1865
 1866
 1867
 1868
 1869
 1870 – Launceston
 1871 – Truro
 1872 – Bodmin, 17331 attendance for the two-day show
 1873 – Penryn, 11,712
 1874 – St Austell 17,022
 1875 – Truro, 24,212
 1876 – Liskeard, 14228
 1877 – Camborne, 17186
 1878 – Saltash, 13,394 
 1879 – Falmouth, 18,926 attendance for the two-day show (12,414 paid for admission) 
 1880 – Lostwithiel (Lanwithan estate), 9,188 paid for admission to the two day show. 
 1881 – Redruth, 20,105
 1882 – Launceston, 16,399
 1883 – Truro (Tremorva), 21,871
 1884 – Bodmin, 16,057 (the following citation applies to the entries for 1870 to 1884) 
 1885 – Penzance (Treneere), 15,569
 1886 –  St Austell (Moire Cottage grounds), 16,551
 1887 – Camborne (Rosewarne), 16,753
 1888 – Newquay, 11,711 
 1889 – Helston, 12,974 
 1890 – Truro, 12,118 
 1891 – Par, 13,484 
 1892 – Redruth, 18,793 
 1893 – Liskeard, 13,067 
 1894 – Falmouth, 18,316 
 1895 – Wadebridge, 16,342 
 1896 – St Ives, 13,040 
 1897 – Lostwithiel, 9,398 
 1898 – Penzance, 17,689 
 1899 – Launceston, 12,838 
 1900 – Truro, 14,560 
 1901 – Bodmin, 14,887 
 1902 – Camborne, 9,508 
 1903 – St Austell, 19,370 
 1904 – Falmouth, 16,287 
 1905 – Newquay, 13,055 
 1906 – Redruth, 20,320 
 1907 – Liskeard, 12,648 
 1908 – Helston, 17,370 
 1909 – St. Columb, 15,757 
 1910 – St Ives, 14,250 
 1911 – St Austell, 18,157
 1912 – Penzance, 21,454 (the following citation applies to the entries for 1889 to 1912) 
 1930 – Liskeard
 1931 – St Columb
 1932 – Penryn
 1933 –
 1960 – 2019 – Wadebridge
 2020 – Postponed due to the COVID-19 pandemic
 2021 –

Business
Businesses with links to agriculture have trade stands at the show, using the opportunity to attract new business as well as to network with current customers.

Social event
The show is attended by people who live in farming communities in Cornwall. 
Events include:
 Judging of cattle, sheep, horses, goats and various other domestic animals
 Sheepdog trials
 Riding competitions
 Driving displays
 Falconry
 Games and sports
 Craft show
 Live music
 The culmination of the county cup for the Cornwall Young Farmers' Club.

References

1827 establishments in England
Agriculture in Cornwall
Cornwall
Annual events in the United Kingdom
Cornish culture
Events in Cornwall
Festivals established in 1827
Lists of fairs
Festivals in England
Summer events in the United Kingdom
Summer festivals